"Hole in the World" is a song by the Eagles, written by Don Henley and Glenn Frey, in response to the September 11, 2001 attacks and subsequent war on Iraq, released in 2003.

This is the first Eagles recording without guitarist Don Felder since 1974, and it was released as a DVD single with some bonus tracks: the "Hole in the World" Stereo Mix & 5.1 Multichannel track, the video, outtakes from the video and a trailer for the DVD Farewell 1 Tour-Live from Melbourne.

"Hole in the World" appears on the 2003 compilation album The Very Best Of, as well as the DVD (only in the first edition). It was also included as a bonus track on the Deluxe Edition of the 2007 album Long Road Out of Eden.

It was nominated for the Grammy Award for Best Pop Performance by a Duo or Group with Vocals in 2004.

Track listing
 "Hole in the World" (5.1 Multichannel Track) – 4:36
 "Hole in the World" (Video) – 4:43
 "Making the Video (Outtakes from the Hole in the World)" – 2:36
 "Backstage Pass to Farewell 1" – 4:53
 "Hole in the World" (Audio Stereo Mix) – 4:30

Personnel
Eagles
Don Henley: drums, lead and harmony vocals
Glenn Frey: Fender Rhodes electric piano, acoustic guitar, harmony vocals
Timothy B. Schmit: bass guitar, harmony vocals
Joe Walsh: Hammond organ, harmony vocals

Additional musicians
Steuart Smith: electric guitar
Will Hollis: acoustic piano
Scott F. Crago: percussion

Production
Producer: Eagles, Bill Szymczyk
Engineer: Steve Churchyard
Additional engineers: Richard Davis, Mike Harlow, Andy Ackland
Video director: Martyn Atkins
Video editor: Randy Edwards, Manny Merchan, William Bullen
Camera operator: Cameron Duncan
Graphic design, camera operator: James Raitt
Photography director, production coordinator: James Meyer
Design, art direction: Jeri Heiden
Photography: James Minchin

Charts

Weekly charts

Year-end charts

References

2003 singles
Eagles (band) songs
Music about the September 11 attacks
Songs written by Glenn Frey
Songs written by Don Henley
Song recordings produced by Bill Szymczyk